Qijiang District is a district of Chongqing, China, bordering Guizhou province to the south. The district has an area of 2,748 km2 and a population of 1,213,770 (de facto resident population 825,500 as of 2017.)

In October 2011, Qijiang County and Wansheng District were merged to form the new Qijiang District.

Administrative divisions

Climate

Transportation 
China National Highway 210
Sichuan–Guizhou Railway

Geology 
The geology is notable for its fossils including ornithopod-dominated tracksite from the Lower Cretaceous Jiaguan Formation (Barremian–Albian).

References

External links

 Official government website

Districts of Chongqing